Since 1879, the four arenas known as Madison Square Garden have hosted many sporting events, concerts, and political rallies.

Notable firsts
 February 12, 1879 - The first artificial ice rink in North America opens at the Garden.
 August 1898 - Nikola Tesla demonstrated the first remote controlled robot using radio control.
 1902 - The first indoor professional American football game is played. The World Series of Pro Football, as it was called, was the first attempt at professional American football championship games.
 1934 - The first college basketball game at the Garden is played, between the University of Notre Dame and New York University.
 February 28, 1940 - Basketball is televised for the first time (Fordham University vs. the University of Pittsburgh).
 March 19, 1954 - Joey Giardello knocks out Willie Tory in round seven at the Garden in the first televised prize boxing fight shown in color.
 February 8, 10, 11, 1979 - The Challenge Cup, a three-game series between the All-Stars of the National Hockey League and the Soviet National Team took place at the Garden. The Soviets won, two games to one.
 November 1, 1980 -The first Women's World Judo Championship was held at the Gardens, Jane Bridge (UK) won the gold medal at under 48 kg
 January 23, 1984 - Hulk Hogan wins the World Wrestling Federation Championship from The Iron Sheik in five minutes, 40 seconds. The victory kicks off the pop culture movement known as Hulkamania, and ushers in a golden age for the business of professional wrestling.
 March 31, 1985 - The World Wrestling Federation (WWF, today known as World Wrestling Entertainment or WWE), presents the inaugural WrestleMania. The annual event would return to Madison Square Garden in 1994 and 2004 for WrestleMania X and WrestleMania XX, celebrating the 10th and 20th editions of WrestleMania.
 August 29, 1988 - The WWF presents the first SummerSlam event. The annual events would return to Madison Square Garden in 1991 and 1998.
 June 14, 1994 - The New York Rangers win the Stanley Cup at Madison Square Garden. It is the first time that a Stanley Cup has been won by the Rangers at the Garden.
 October 1995 - Jacky Cheung, Hong Kong singer and the best selling Asian artist in the mid-1990s, is the first Asian artist to perform at the Paramount, Madison Square Garden. His two-show performance in October 1995 is part of his 100-show world tour that year.
 June 29, 1997 - The New York Liberty professional women's basketball team plays its first home game - the first WNBA game to be played at Madison Square Garden.
 November 17, 2002 - World Wrestling Entertainment held the first ever Elimination chamber match at Survivor Series.
 March 1, 2003 - Quinnipiac University defeats the University of Connecticut 4–3 in the first college hockey game played at Madison Square Garden since 1977.
 July 13 & 15, 2007 - Popular Boston-based indie band Dispatch sold out MSG for three nights in a row and became the first independent band to either headline or sell out MSG.
 In 2014, the NCAA basketball tournament came to the current Garden for the first time, when it hosted the East Regional semifinals and final. These were the first NCAA Tournament games played in the Five Boroughs in 53 years; the current incarnation of MSG had been one of the few big-city arenas to have never hosted an NCAA Tournament game.  The old Garden had hosted 71 NCAA Tournament games in its history, including seven Final Fours.
On March 17–19, 2016, the NCAA Division I Wrestling Championships were held for the first time at MSG.
 October 21, 2016 - The semifinals of the 2016 League of Legends World Championship were held for the first time at MSG.
 November 12, 2016 - UFC 205: Alvarez vs. McGregor is the first UFC event held in NYC. Broke MSG gate record and Conor McGregor became the first fighter in UFC history to hold 2 world titles in different weight classes simultaneously by defeating Eddie Alvarez for the lightweight title.
July 21–August 6, 2017 - Phish plays the longest consecutive residency held by a single artist, topping at 13 nights with zero repeats. Over this run titled The Baker's Dozen, they played 237 songs over a span of 26 sets.
 December 9 - Why Don't We performs at Madison Square Garden for the Jingle Ball Tour. Zachary Herron, the youngest member of Why Don't We, is the second youngest person to perform at Madison Square Garden; Justin Bieber was the youngest.
June 16, 2018 - Logic performs at Madison Square Garden for the Bobby Tarantino vs. Everybody Tour. He mentioned the tour in his 2019 song "Keanu Reeves".
April 6, 2019 - Ring of Honor and New Japan Pro-Wrestling hosted their first event in the venue called G1 Supercard, this was the first non-WWE event in the venue since 1960.
June 20, 2021 - The American rock band Foo Fighters holds the first concert since the beginning of the COVID-19 pandemic.

Entertainment

Political and social events

 August 13, 1920 Marcus Garvey chaired a meeting of the Universal Negro Improvement Association. The event resulted in signing of the Declaration of Rights of the Negro People of the World which designated Red, Black and Green as the colors of people of African ancestry worldwide.
 The 1924, 1976, 1980, and 1992 Democratic National Conventions were held at MSG.
On October 31, 1936, Franklin D. Roosevelt delivered his last speech before that year's presidential election. In it, he criticized the interests who opposed the New Deal, stating, "I welcome their hatred."
 On February 20, 1939, A large German American Bund convention was held prompting riots and protests in and around the arena by American Jews and others. 20,000 Nazi supporters attended.
 Former Republican Party presidential candidate Wendell Willkie led 20,000 African Americans on June 7, 1943, the largest Civil Rights rally of its time, in calling for equal rights and for victory in the war against Hitler.
 On January 10, 1944, the Daily Worker, newspaper of the Communist Party USA, held an event at the Garden to mark its 20th anniversary. 
 President John F. Kennedy's 45th birthday celebration took place at the Garden on May 19, 1962. During it, Marilyn Monroe sang her now infamous Happy Birthday, Mr. President.
 On July 1, 1982 Rev. and Mrs. Sun Myung Moon held a Blessing Ceremony in the Garden for 2075 couples. This event attracted much public and media attention (including a story in Life), often being called a "mass wedding."
 The 2004 Republican National Convention at MSG marked the first time that the Republican party held their convention in New York City.
 On September 28, 2014, The prime minister of India, Mr. Narendra Modi, addressed congregation organised by NRIs inhabiting in USA.
 The Garden was the site for a Catholic Mass said by Pope Francis during his first visit to New York City and the United States as Pontiff on September 25, 2015.

Boxing
Madison Square Garden was one of the primary centers of the boxing universe throughout its history and in all of its incarnations before Las Vegas became the sport's main center starting in the 1980s. However, MSG still hosts many significant fights. Some of the historic fights held at MSG have been:
 October 26, 1951 — Rocky Marciano vs. Joe Louis
 The unbeaten Marciano, who would become heavyweight champion the following year, knocked out a clearly past-his-prime Louis in the 8th round. After the loss, Louis retired for the second time, this time for good.
 Two of the three Ali–Frazier fights:
 March 8, 1971 — Fight of the Century
 One of the most hyped fights in history, with both heavyweight champion Frazier and challenger Ali entering unbeaten. Frazier won by unanimous decision.
 January 28, 1974 — Ali-Frazier II
 Ali avenges his loss to Frazier, also by unanimous decision.
 June 13, 1986 — Hector Camacho vs. Edwin Rosario
 A classic showdown between Puerto Rican stars Héctor Camacho and Edwin Rosario for Camacho's lightweight title, with Camacho retaining his title by a controversial split decision.
 July 11, 1996 — Riddick Bowe vs. Andrew Golota
 Though ahead on points, Golota was penalized several times for low blows, and was finally disqualified in the seventh round after a volley of punches to Bowe's testicles. Seconds after Golota was disqualified, Bowe's entourage rushed the ring, attacked Golota with a two way radio, and assaulted Golota's 74-year-old trainer Lou Duva. The entourage began rioting, fighting with spectators, staff and policemen alike, resulting in a number of injuries before they were forced out of the arena in what evolved into a lengthy televised ring spectacle.
 September 29, 2001 — The final bout of the Middleweight World Championship Series, in which Bernard Hopkins defeated Félix Trinidad by 12th-round TKO to claim the undisputed title.
 October 2, 2004 — Trinidad vs. Mayorga
 Trinidad returned from a two-year layoff and defeated Ricardo Mayorga by TKO in the 8th round.
 November 8, 2008 — Joe Calzaghe vs. Roy Jones Jr.
 In what proved to be his last professional bout, the unbeaten Joe Calzaghe won a unanimous decision over Roy Jones Jr.
 June 1, 2019 — Anthony Joshua vs. Andy Ruiz Jr.
 After coming in as a 25-1 underdog, Ruiz won the match via technical knockout in the seventh round, ending Joshua's undefeated record and becoming the new unified heavyweight champion.
 April 30, 2022 — Katie Taylor vs. Amanda Serrano
 First women's boxing match to headline Madison Square Garden. In what was described as the 'biggest women's fight of all time', Taylor defeated Serrano by split decision, remaining the undisputed lightweight champion.

Mixed martial arts
After the New York State Athletic Commission authorized mixed martial events in 2016, the MSG has hosted multiple major bouts:

 November 12, 2016 — UFC 205: Alvarez vs. McGregor
 Conor McGregor defeated Eddie Alvarez for the UFC Lightweight Championship.
 Tyron Woodley fought Stephen Thompson for the UFC Welterweight Championship. The fight resulted in a majority draw.
 Joanna Jędrzejczyk defeated Karolina Kowalkiewicz for the UFC Women's Strawweight Championship.
 June 24, 2017 — Bellator NYC/Bellator 180
 Chael Sonnen defeated Wanderlei Silva.
 Matt Mitrione defeated Fedor Emelianenko.
 Brent Primus defeated Michael Chandler. 
 November 4, 2017 — UFC 217: Bisping vs. St-Pierre
 Georges St-Pierre defeated Michael Bisping for the UFC Middleweight Championship.
 T.J. Dillashaw defeated Cody Garbrandt for the UFC Bantamweight Championship.
 Rose Namajunas defeated Joanna Jędrzejczyk for the UFC Women's Strawweight Championship.
 November 3, 2018 — UFC 230: Cormier vs. Lewis
 Daniel Cormier defeated Derrick Lewis for the UFC Heavyweight Championship.
 June 14, 2019  — Bellator 222
 Rory MacDonald defeated Neiman Gracie for the Bellator Welterweight World Championship.
 November 2, 2019 — UFC 244: Masvidal vs. Diaz
 Jorge Masvidal defeated Nate Diaz for the symbolic "BMF" Championship.
 November 6, 2021 — UFC 268: Usman vs. Covington 2
 Kamaru Usman defeated Colby Covington for the UFC Welterweight Championship.
 Rose Namajunas defeated Zhang Weili for the UFC Women's Strawweight Championship.
 November 12, 2022 — UFC 281: Adesanya vs. Pereira
 Alex Pereira defeated Israel Adesanya for the UFC Middleweight Championship.
 Zhang Weili defeated Carla Esparza for the UFC Women's Strawweight Championship.

References

External links
 A Night at the Garden, a 2017 documentary about the 1939 German Bund rally by Marshall Curry

Events in New York City
Lists of events in the United States
Lists of events by venue